Raúl Ernesto Cardozo (born 28 October 1967) is a former Argentine football defender who is one of the most important players in the history of Vélez Sársfield.

Career
Cardozo, nicknamed Pacha was born in Morón and started his playing career with Vélez Sársfield during the 1986–87 season. He went on to play over 350 games for the club. He played during the golden era of the club in the mid-1990s when they won 9 major titles.

Cardozo helped Velez to win their first league title in 25 years when they claimed the Clausura 1993 championship. The following season they won the Copa Libertadores and the Copa Intercontinental.

Velez won both league titles during the 1995–96 season.

In 1997 Cardozo was called up to join the Argentina squad to play in the 1997 Copa América.

His last major title with Velez was the Clausura 1998 championship.

In 1999 Cardozo left Velez, he played for a number of different teams: Newell's Old Boys and Chacarita Juniors in the Argentine Primera, Nacional in Uruguay, where he won a league title, Olimpia in Paraguay and finally Villa Dálmine in the lower leagues of Argentine football.

Coaching career
Cardozo had been the assistant manager of Omar Asad at Godoy Cruz and Sportivo Estudiantes. In March 2019, he was appointed manager of Club Almirante Brown. He left the club again at the end of June 2019.

Honours

Club
Vélez Sársfield
 Torneo Apertura: 1995
 Torneo Clausura: 1993, 1996, 1998
 Copa Libertadores: 1994
 Intercontinental Cup: 1994
 Copa Interamericana: 1994
 Supercopa Sudamericana: 1996
 Recopa Sudamericana: 1997

Nacional
 Primera División Uruguaya: 2001

Villa Dálmine
 Primera C Metropolitana Apertura: 2002

References

External links
 
 Argentine Primera statistics

1967 births
Living people
People from Morón Partido
Argentine footballers
Association football defenders
Club Atlético Vélez Sarsfield footballers
Newell's Old Boys footballers
Chacarita Juniors footballers
Club Olimpia footballers
Club Nacional de Football players
Copa Libertadores-winning players
Argentine Primera División players
Expatriate footballers in Uruguay
Expatriate footballers in Paraguay
Argentina international footballers
Argentine expatriate footballers
1997 Copa América players
Argentine expatriate sportspeople in Uruguay
Argentine expatriate sportspeople in Paraguay
Sportspeople from Buenos Aires Province